The following is a list of khagans of the Northern Yuan (1368–1635) based in Northern China and the Mongolian Plateau.

List of khans

Period of small kings

See also
 Borjigin
 List of Yuan emperors
 Yuan dynasty family tree
 List of Chinese monarchs
 List of Mongol rulers
 List of Mongol khatuns

 
Lists of Chinese monarchs
Lists of khans
Lists of Chinese people
Lists of leaders of China